Pahute Mesa Airstrip  is a private-use airport located  northwest of the central business district of Mercury, in Nye County, Nevada, United States. The airport is owned by the United States Department of Energy.

History 
Originally built in 1941 as an emergency landing strip for Army Air Corps fighters, the airstrip was expanded in 1968 to allow transport aircraft to bring test materials and supplies to projects at Areas 19 and 20. Permission to land must be obtained in advance from the US Department of Energy.

Facilities 
The runway had numbers with both ends, but it is now marked with "X" on either end.

A small ramp area allows planes and helicopters to park at the airstrip. Beside three small hangars, there are no other permanent structures at the airstrip.

References

External links 

Airfields of the United States Army Air Forces in Nevada
Airports in Nevada
Buildings and structures in Nye County, Nevada
Transportation in Nye County, Nevada